The F30 test is a type of fire resistance test that determines the ability of a material or assembly to withstand exposure to fire for a duration of 30 minutes. This test is commonly used for building materials and construction elements, such as walls and floors.

Vehicles 
Aircraft
 Farman F.30, a French biplane
 Golden Avio F30, an Italian ultralight

Automobiles
 Alpina B3 (F30), a German high-performance car
 BMW 3 Series (F30), a German sedan
 Farmall F-30, an American tractor
 Kaicene F30, a Chinese pickup truck
 Nissan Leopard F30, a Japanese sedan
 Toyota Kijang (F30), a Japanese pickup truck

Ships
 , an armed merchant cruiser of the Royal Navy

Other uses 
 F-30 (Michigan county highway)
 Fujifilm FinePix F-30, a digital camera
 Hirth F-30, an aircraft engine
 Mania